Ezekiel 10 is the tenth chapter of the Book of Ezekiel in the Hebrew Bible or the Old Testament of the Christian Bible. This book contains the prophecies attributed to the prophet/priest Ezekiel, and is one of the Books of the Prophets. In this chapter, Ezekiel sees "God's Glory depart from the Temple".

Text
The original text was written in the Hebrew language. This chapter is divided into 22 verses.

Textual witnesses
Some early manuscripts containing the text of this chapter in Hebrew are of the Masoretic Text tradition, which includes the Codex Cairensis (895), the Petersburg Codex of the Prophets (916), Aleppo Codex (10th century), and Codex Leningradensis (1008). Fragments containing parts of this chapter were found among the Dead Sea Scrolls, that is, 4Q73 (4QEzek; 50–25 BCE) with extant verses 5–22.

There is also a translation into Koine Greek known as the Septuagint, made in the last few centuries BC. Extant ancient manuscripts of the Septuagint version include Codex Vaticanus (B; B; 4th century), Codex Alexandrinus (A; A; 5th century) and Codex Marchalianus (Q; Q; 6th century).

Verse 1
I looked, and there in the firmament that was above the head of the cherubim, there appeared something like a sapphire stone, having the appearance of the likeness of a throne".
The sapphire stone is said to be like a throne of lapis lazuli in the New International Version.

Verse 4
 Then the glory of the Lord went up from the cherub, and stood over the threshold of the house; and the house was filled with the cloud, and the court was full of the brightness of the Lord's glory. "Cherub" (Hebrew: כרוב ; plural: Cherubim): in Brown-Driver-Briggs is defined as "the living chariot of the theophanic God." Gesenius describes it as "a being of a sublime and celestial nature."

Verse 15
 And the cherubims were lifted up. This is the living creature that I saw by the river of Chebar. "Cherub": see notes on Ezekiel 10:4.

Verse 20
 This is the living creature that I saw under the God of Israel by the river of Chebar;and I knew that they were the cherubims. "Living creature": see notes on Ezekiel 10:15.

Verse 22
 And the likeness of their faces was the same as the faces which I had seen by the River Chebar, their appearance and their persons. They each went straight forward.'' (NKJV)
 "River Chebar": is generally identified as the "Kebar Canal", near Nippur in what is now Iraq. It was part of a complex network of irrigation and transport canals which also included the Shatt el-Nil, a silted up canal toward the east of Babylon.

See also

Ark of the Covenant
Chebar river
Cherubim
Israel
Jerusalem
Judah
Living creatures
Mercy seat
Shekhinah

Related Bible parts: Deuteronomy 31, Ezekiel 1, Hosea 9, 1 Corinthians 14, Hebrews 1, Revelation 2

Notes

References

Bibliography

External links

Jewish
Ezekiel 10 Hebrew with Parallel English
Ezekiel 10 Hebrew with Rashi's Commentary

Christian
Ezekiel 10 English Translation with Parallel Latin Vulgate

10
Cherubim